The 2017 Motorcycle Grand Prix of the Americas was the third round of the 2017 MotoGP season. It was held at the Circuit of the Americas in Austin on April 23, 2017.

Classification

MotoGP

 Álex Rins suffered a broken forearm in a crash during Saturday practice and withdrew from the event.

Moto2

 Lecuona pulled out of the race due to pain in the arm he'd broken during pre-season testing. Kent cited a pinched nerve in his back but later quit the team.

Moto3
The race, scheduled to be run for 18 laps, was red-flagged due to Kaito Toba's crash in Turn 14 and was later restarted over 12 laps.

Championship standings after the race

MotoGP
Below are the standings for the top five riders and constructors after round three has concluded.

Riders' Championship standings

Constructors' Championship standings

 Note: Only the top five positions are included for both sets of standings.

Moto2

Moto3

Notes

References

Americas
Grand Prix of the Americas
Motorcycle Grand Prix of the Americas
Motorcycle
Motorcycle